AcreTrader is an online farmland investment company based in Arkansas, United States. The company was established in 2018 and the online portal was launched in March 2019. It has completed three rounds of funding, including a $5 million seed round, $12 million Series A round, and a $60 million+ Series B round.

Operations
Through the online portal, accredited investors can select potential farm offerings, review due diligence, and invest in land by completing the monetary transaction and legalities on the portal. The company charges a management fee to investors and also owns a real estate brokerage. AcreTrader buys a small percentage of the total parcels considered, then places each farm offering in a unique entity, typically a limited liability company (LLC), and offers shares to investors through its online platform that uses some aspects of crowdfunding. Each entity is divided into shares equal to one-tenth of an acre.

AcreTrader's online marketplace works for investors wanting to invest in farmland, and farmers looking to grow their operation.

Overview
AcreTrader was started in May 2018 and is headquartered in Fayetteville, Arkansas. Carter Malloy, a former investment professional, is the CEO and founder of the company. As of January 2022, it has more than 120 employees.

In April 2020, the company raised over $5 million in seed round with investments from RZC Investments, Revel Partners and other angel investors. In March 2021, it raised an additional $12 million in capital in its Series A funding round led by Jump Capital, with participation from Narya Capital, Revolution's Rise of the Rest Seed Fund and existing investors. As part of the investment, Peter Johnson, partner at Jump Capital, and Kenny Traynom, former COO of Westchester Group, joined the company's board of directors. Johnson has since left the board.

Subsequent funding rounds included a $40 million Series B round in January 2022 led by London-based Anthemis Group and joined by all existing investors in the company. Ruth Foxe Blader, Partner at Anthemis Group, joined the board of directors. In March 2022, AcreTrader expanded its Series B funding to over $60 million following an investment from Columbus, Ohio-based venture capital firm Drive Capital.

References

External links 

American companies established in 2018
Investment companies of the United States
Financial services companies of the United States
Agricultural organizations based in the United States